Wallace Clifford Gordon (April 21, 1881 -  November 5, 1955) was a Negro leagues Utility player for several years before the founding of the first Negro National League.

Sportswriter Harry Daniels named Gordon to his 1909 "All American Team" saying he is "the best man ever to play third base in colored base ball." Daniels added that Gordon was "the peer of base-stealers."

Gordon played for many different teams, and played with some of the top pre-Negro leagues players, such as Dizzy Dismukes, Bingo DeMoss, Oscar Charleston, and Ben Taylor.

References

External links

Negro league baseball managers
Indianapolis ABCs players
1881 births
1955 deaths
People from Greenville, Pennsylvania
Baseball players from Pennsylvania
People from Painesville, Ohio
20th-century African-American people